Andreyevsky is a rural locality (a khutor) in Khopyorskoye Rural Settlement, Novonikolayevsky District, Volgograd Oblast, Russia. The population was 73 as of 2010. There are 2 streets.

Geography 
Andreyevsky is located in steppe, on the Khopyorsko-Buzulukskaya Plain, on the left bank of the Kardail River, 51 km southeast of Novonikolayevsky (the district's administrative centre) by road. Novokardailsky is the nearest rural locality.

References 

Rural localities in Novonikolayevsky District